The Taia is a right tributary of the river Jiul de Est in Romania. It discharges into the Jiul de Est in the town Petrila.

References

Rivers of Romania
Rivers of Hunedoara County